Lake Pedder, once a glacial outwash lake, is a man-made impoundment and diversion lake located in the southwest of Tasmania, Australia. In addition to its natural catchment from the Frankland Range, the lake is formed by the 1972 damming of the Serpentine and Huon rivers by the Hydro Electric Commission of Tasmania for the purposes of hydroelectric power generation.

The original and modified lake
In early 20th century the original lake was named after Sir John Pedder, the first Chief Justice of Tasmania. The new artificial impoundment received the official name of the original lake. Although the new Lake Pedder incorporates the original lake, it does not resemble it in size, appearance or ecology.

The new lake consists of an impoundment contained by three dams:

The dams were designed and constructed by Tasmania's Hydro Electric Commission (HEC) as part of the Upper Gordon River hydro-electric generation scheme. The aim of this scheme was to increase Tasmania's capacity to generate hydro-electricity in accordance with the Tasmanian Government's policy of attempting to attract secondary industry to the State with the incentive of cheap renewable energy.

Together, the lakes form the biggest water catchment and storage system in Australia.

Climate
Lake Pedder has an oceanic climate (Köppen: Cfb).

Damming
There were protests in Tasmania and mainland Australia at the flooding of the original lake, before, during and after construction of the dams. Protests began when in 1967 the Tasmanian Government revoked the status of the Lake Pedder National Park that had protected the lake since 1955. The role of the HEC as a surrogate wing of the Tasmanian government was perceived when the political or wider social dissent against the HEC power over the Tasmanian environment seemed impregnable. Tasmania's political leader, Premier Eric Reece and Allan Knight, the HEC Commissioner, were seen as the leading proponents of the 'damming' of Tasmania against any opinion to the contrary, and were not averse to taking their opinions to statewide and national advertising campaigns asserting their right to dam the lake.

Reece was well known for his staunch support of the HEC and its power development schemes on the Gordon River, which earned him the nickname "Electric Eric". In 1972, Reece approved the flooding of Lake Pedder, which proceeded despite a determined protest movement and a blank cheque offer from Prime Minister Gough Whitlam to preserve the Lake Pedder area. Reece refused Whitlam's offer, stating that he would "not have the Federal Government interfering with the sovereign rights of Tasmania".

A series of photographs in the 1976 Tasmanian Year book illustrated the process of flooding of the Lake Pedder area.

Community response
Opposition to the flooding of Lake Pedder extended well beyond Tasmania and spread throughout Australia and internationally. The focus on the South West Tasmania Wilderness area as an environmental battleground increased interest in the area, and many travelled to Lake Pedder before it was flooded to see what the issues were about.

In 1971, a large number of people travelled to Pedder to see the lake before it was to be inundated, and a particular weekend in March of that year became known as the Pedder Pilgrimage due to the large number of people present.

The protests included the United Tasmania Group who were the precursor to the Tasmanian Greens and are now recognised as the world's first green party. The group that preceded the Tasmanian Wilderness Society – the South West Tasmania Action Committee continued after the flooding, with the knowledge that surveying and appraising other catchments in the south west and west of Tasmania was well underway by the HEC. Although increasingly sophisticated economic, environmental and engineering arguments were raised by the opponents of the dam, it was not until the Franklin scheme that either the Hydro or its defenders were even considering the critiques. In 1972, the Christian activist Brenda Hean perished with pilot Max Price in a tiger moth aircraft they were flying from Tasmania to Canberra to protest the damming of Lake Pedder; it was alleged that pro-dam campaigners had entered the plane's hangar and placed sugar in one of its fuel tanks.

Hesba Fay Brinsmead, an Australian children's author and environmentalist, wrote two books about the damming of Lake Pedder:
 Echo in the Wilderness is a children's novel set on Lake Pedder on the eve of its flooding (published 1972)
 I Will Not Say the Day Is Done (her only non-fiction/adult book) describes the struggle to save Lake Pedder (published 1983)

Concerns over the construction of the dam revolved around the loss of the distinctive pink quartzite beach of the original lake, and an increased understanding of the unique nature of the wilderness quality to the south west of Tasmania. This developed further with the Franklin Dam issue.

In 1994, a campaign group was launched called Pedder 2000. They proposed, unsuccessfully, the draining and restoration of the lake to its original state. There is an ongoing low-key campaign with the same goal by the group known as the Lake Pedder Action Committee which remains active.

A controversial and contested name
As is the case in many land use, land ownership and territorial disputes, the name currently officially assigned to this body of water has considerable significance. It is also important in terms of understanding the technical status of the body of water as a component of a hydro-electric scheme.

From a technical, hydro-electric scheme point of view, the current Lake Pedder can be correctly termed a lake or reservoir as the water from Lake Pedder can flow into Lake Gordon via the McPartlan's Pass canal and is thereby connected to the Gordon power station. However, people opposed to the flooding of the original lake do not accept the legitimacy of the official, gazetted name of Lake Pedder for the body of water that drowned it in 1972. Instead, they prefer to use the name Huon–Serpentine Impoundment. This name denotes the two major rivers dammed to create the current lake (Huon and Serpentine) and describes the technical status of the lake as an element of a hydro-electric scheme (impoundment) more accurately than the terms lake or reservoir. Bushwalkers sometimes informally refer to it as "Fake Pedder".

Lake Pedder extinctions
The Lake Pedder earthworm (Hypolimnus pedderensis) is only known by the type specimen collected from a beach on Lake Pedder, Tasmania in 1971. After the flooding of the lake, this invertebrate was never seen again. A 1996 survey that sought to determine whether the species still existed in the area failed to find any examples. Since 2003 the Lake Pedder Earthworm has been listed as extinct on the IUCN Red List of Threatened Species.

An extinction claimed to have occurred after the flooding is that of the Lake Pedder planarian (Romankenkius pedderensis), an endemic flatworm. Since 1996 this invertebrate has also been listed as extinct on the IUCN Red List of Threatened Species. In 2012, the continued existence of this species was reported.

The Pedder galaxias, an Australian freshwater fish, is considered extinct in its natural habitat of Lake Pedder and its tributaries, although it still exists in captivity and in two translocated populations, one at Lake Oberon in the Western Arthurs mountain range and the other at a modified water supply dam near Strathgordon.

Restoration Campaign
To coincide with the United Nations Decade of Ecological Restoration, 2021–2030, the Lake Pedder Restoration Committee is aiming to have the lake restored to its original state. The committee, convened by Christine Milne with support from Todd Dudley, Bob Brown, Paul Thomas and Tabatha Badger, plans to have  an Ecological Management Plan to restore the original Lake Pedder and surrounding iconic ecosystems.

Gallery

See also

List of reservoirs and dams in Tasmania
List of lakes in Tasmania
 Gordon Power Station
 Olegas Truchanas
 Olegas (opera)
 The South West Book

References

Further reading

External links
 
 Position in World Heritage Area – Tasmanian National Parks
 Panorama of new Lake Pedder – Photograph
 National Archives original documents relating to Lake Pedder
 

 
Pedder, Lake
History of Tasmania
Dam controversies
Environment of Tasmania
Protests in Australia
Hydro-Tasmania
Gordon River power development scheme